is a Japanese television broadcasting company serving viewers in Europe, the Middle East, and North Africa. Launched in March 1990 and broadcasting from London, it carries the programming from the NHK World Premium service in the regions served.

The channel initially broadcast for two hours each night from 8pm (GMT) on the Lifestyle transponder 5 on the Astra 1A satellite in analogue format (frequency 11.273 MHz, time-sharing with The Children's Channel, Lifestyle and The Lifestyle Satellite Jukebox). Later on 3 June 1991, it started using transponder 24 on Astra 1B, at frequency 11.567 MHz for 11 hours a day, using the Videocrypt II encryption (time-sharing with The Children's Channel and later with CMT Europe). It eventually moved to transponder 53 (frequency 10.773) to broadcast 24 hours a day. Analogue transmissions for JSTV on Astra ceased on 31 October 2001.

JSTV currently broadcasts in DVB-S on Eutelsat Hotbird 6, encrypted in Conax, except some programmes, and broadcasts programs of NHK, Fuji TV, TV Tokyo and other main Japanese broadcasters. News programs are mostly direct and Live from the original broadcaster, however several other programs such as Anime and Variety shows are not up to date. Not all programs are encrypted; NHK News 7, News Watch 9 and some English programs are broadcast free-to-air.

JSTV currently operates two channels: JSTV1 which broadcasts TV programmes approximately 20 hours a day and JSTV2 which broadcasts TV programmes 24 hours a day.

Stockholders 
 NHK Enterprise, Inc.
 Marubeni Corporation Plc
 Mizuho Corporate Bank, Ltd.
 All Nippon Airways, Co. Ltd
 Mitsukoshi UK, Ltd.
 NHK Global Media Services, Inc.

Encryption & Availability 
 Satellite
DVB-S MPEG-2: Hot Bird 6 (12597 MHz, Vertical, 3/4, VPID 2000, APID 2002/2001) Encrypted (Conax). Cryptoworks encryption was discontinued on 30 September 2019.

Analogue: ASTRA [Closed down on 31 October 2001]

 Hotels
Currently, JSTV broadcasts in several hotels in Europe and the Middle East, Complete list available on the official web site of JSTV and NHK's English page "Overseas hotels carrying NHK"

 JSTV-i
JSTV is available through "JSTV-i" to European consumers via Western Digital's WD TV LIVE STB. More information is available on the official JSTV-i web site.

Channels 

JSTV 1: TV programmes

JSTV 2: Radio programmes (NHK World Radio Japan) and JSTV 1 TV Schedule on screen. (Since 31 March 2008 JSTV 2 broadcast TV programmes from 1700 UK time to 2200 UK time 7 days a week, and from 1 April 2009 now broadcasts TV Programmes from 0500 to 1000 and then 1500 to 2200 UK time)

Programmes 

Dual language News (Japanese & English) 
 NHK News 7
 NHK Newswatch 9
 Global Debate WISDOM
 Sumo

News
 NHK/BS NEWS
 Good Morning, Japan
 Sunday Sports News
 FNN Speak
 FNN Super News
 NHK Newswatch 9
 Today's Close-up

Variety
 Hello from Studio Park  (スタジオパークからこんにちは) NHK
 Riddles on Mobile  (着信御礼！ケータイ大喜利) NHK
 VS Arashi  (VS嵐) Fuji TV
 Shoten (笑点) NTV
 Why did you come to Japan?  (Youは何しに日本へ？) TV Tokyo
 Peke X Pon  (ペケXポン) Fuji TV

Documentary
 NHK Special (NHKスペシャル)NHK
 The Professionals (プロフェッショナル仕事の流儀)NHK
 Document 72hours (ドキュメント７２時間) NHK

Anime
 Ace of Diamond (ダイヤのA) 
 Keroro (ケロロ軍曹)
 Chibi Maruko-chan (ちびまる子ちゃん)

Kids
 Grand Whiz-Kids TV (大！天才てれびくん)
 Okaasan to Issho (With Mother おかあさんといっしょ)
 Inai Inai Baa! (いないいないばあっ!)
 Play Japanese (にほんごであそぼ)
 Play English (えいごであそぼ)

Complete programme list available at here

Related Channels 
NHK World Premium
NHK World Premium Australia

External links

NHK
Japanese-language television stations
Television channels and stations established in 1990
1990 establishments in Japan